Philippe Gondet (17 May 1942 – 21 January 2018) was a French footballer who played as a striker. He played for France during the 1966 FIFA World Cup in England.

References

External links

Profile on French federation official site

1942 births
2018 deaths
Sportspeople from Blois
French footballers
France international footballers
Association football forwards
Stade Français (association football) players
FC Nantes players
Red Star F.C. players
Ligue 1 players
1966 FIFA World Cup players
Footballers from Centre-Val de Loire